Big Green may refer to:

 The nickname for Dartmouth College
 Athletic teams are known as the Dartmouth Big Green
 The Big Green, a 1995 Disney film
 Big Green (Dragon Ball), a nickname for Piccolo
 Big Green (non-profit company), a US-based business
 Big Green Island, part of the Big Green Group of islands northeast of Tasmania, Australia
 Jul Big Green (born 1990), American musician and producer
 Lake Big Green, Green Lake County, Wisconsin
 Hokkaido Big Green, a nickname for Hokkaido University, Sapporo, Japan
 Big Green, a numbers game run by the Oneida Nation of Wisconsin
 An nickname for Charlie Green (c. 1895-1935), American jazz trombonist

See also